Maru's Mission is an action video game released in 1991 by Jaleco for the original Game Boy. On January 18, 2012, it was released to the Japanese 3DS Virtual Console and later in North America on February 9, 2012.

It is the first game from the Jajamaru series, aside from the loosely related Ninja Taro, to be released in North America, until the release of Ninja JaJaMaru-kun through the Virtual Console. The soundtrack, as well as many sprites and some cut-scenes of the North American version are different from the original Japanese.

Gameplay
Maru's girlfriend Cori is kidnapped and hidden in a secret location. The player is Maru, and moves through six levels based on various folklore monsters.

Worlds
 North America: A forest
 Mini boss: Eyeclops
 Boss battle: Insector
 Romania: First level is a desert. Second is a cemetery.
 Mini boss: Wolfman
 Boss battle: Dracula
 Greece: An underground bone cavern
 Mini boss: Golem
 Boss battle: Medusa
 Egypt: A desert
 Mini boss: Sphinx
 Boss battle: Isis
 Brazil: First level is a mountain. Second is a cemetery. 
 Mini boss: Hydra
 Boss battle: Kelbelos
 Japan: A Ninja dojo
 Mini boss: Nioh
 Boss battle: Muramasa

References

1990 video games
Action video games
Game Boy games
Jaleco games
Ninja Jajamaru
Video games developed in Japan
Virtual Console games
Video games set in New York City
Video games set in Japan
Video games set in Romania
Video games set in Greece
Video games set in Brazil
Video games set in Egypt
Virtual Console games for Nintendo 3DS
Single-player video games